Esmond Joseph Downey AM (11 August 1923 – 3 March 2011) was an Australian rules footballer who played with Melbourne in the Victorian Football League (VFL).

Career 
Downey, who went to Xavier College, was a centre half-back for Melbourne University, before joining Melbourne in 1944. He played 16 league games for Melbourne in the 1944 VFL season and at the end of the year was named "Best First Year Player" at the club awards. He later played for Old Xaverians, coaching them in 1950 and 1951.

Later life 
Downey was made a Member of the Order of Australia in 2008, for "service to the community through a range of church, educational and aged care organisations."

Notes

External links 

1923 births
Australian rules footballers from Melbourne
Melbourne Football Club players
Members of the Order of Australia
2011 deaths
Australian Army personnel of World War II
People educated at Xavier College
Old Xaverians Football Club players
Australian Army soldiers
Military personnel from Melbourne